9 A.M. or variants may refer to:

A time on the 12-hour clock
9am with David & Kim, a former Australian TV show
"9 AM", a 1991 song by Londonbeat
"9 AM", a 2011 song with Waka Flocka Flame

See also
"9AM in Dallas", a song by Drake
9am to 5pm, 5pm to Whenever, an album by TYP

Date and time disambiguation pages